Grupo Galé is a Colombian salsa music band.  Their album Auténtico was nominated for Latin Grammy Award for Best Salsa Album at the Latin Grammy Awards of 2008. Their record label is Codiscos.

Discography
 Frívolo (1989)
 Nuestra Salsa (1990)
 Sensitivo (1991)
 A Conciencia (1992)
 Sin Apariciencias (1994)
 Afirmando (1995)
 Dominando La Salsa (1996)
 Grandes Hits (1997)
 En Su Sitio (1997)
 Salsadiccion (1997)
 Internacional (1998)
 10 Años (1999)
 Con El Mismo Swing (2001)
 20 De Julio (2002)
 Esencia Latina (2004)
 Pa' Colombia y Nueva York (2006)
 Auténtico (2008)

References

Colombian salsa musical groups